Ceromitia turpisella, the dusted longhorn, is a species of moth of the  family Adelidae. It is known from South Africa and Zimbabwe. It is found in a wide range of habitats and is common in semi-arid areas.

The wingspan is about 15 mm. Adults have long antennae and a white body and wings. There are two distinct oblique bands on the forewings.

References

Adelidae
Moths of Africa
Moths described in 1863